Captain Jenkin Robert Oswald Thompson GC (13 July 1911 – 24 January 1944) was posthumously awarded the George Cross for conspicuous gallantry and devotion to duty. He was awarded the decoration for the courage he showed while serving as a captain in the Royal Army Medical Corps on board HM Hospital Carriers Paris and St. David in Sicily and Anzio.

George Cross
Thompson was awarded a posthumous George Cross for his duty from May 1940 to January 1944, while serving as a captain in the Royal Army Medical Corps on board the HM Hospital Carriers Paris (at Dunkirk in May 1940); and the HM Hospital Carriers St. David(at Sicily from 10 to 14 July 1943; at Salerno from 10 to 15 September 1943; and at Anzio during 23/24 January 1944).

On all these occasions, despite repeated dive-bombing attacks and enemy shell-fire, he showed indifference to danger and physical exhaustion in the care of his patients. On the night of 24 January 1944 as the St. David sailed out from Anzio he displayed outstanding heroism when the ship was sinking rapidly as the result of a direct hit from a Luftwaffe dive-bomber.

Captain Thompson organised parties to carry the seriously wounded to safety in the boats and by his courage and coolness was instrumental in saving the lives of all the patients in his ward, except one, as well as those of many walking cases from other wards. Finally, when the ship was about to founder and all were ordered to save themselves, he returned alone to almost certain death in an endeavour to save the one remaining patient who was still lying trapped below decks. He went down with the ship.

George Cross citation
His citation was published in the London Gazette on 2 February 1945.

References

1911 births
1944 deaths
British recipients of the George Cross
British Army personnel killed in World War II
Royal Army Medical Corps officers
People from Surrey
People from Fulham
20th-century British medical doctors
People lost at sea
Military personnel from London